Anna von Harnier (born 27 January 1981) is a German judoka, competing in the 63 kg-category. Von Harnier, who is currently ranked at 4th Dan, won bronze medals at the 2003 World Judo Championships and the 2007 European Judo Championships. She competed in the 2004 and 2008 Summer Olympics.

References

External links
 

1981 births
Living people
German female judoka
Olympic judoka of Germany
Judoka at the 2004 Summer Olympics
Judoka at the 2008 Summer Olympics
21st-century German women